James Landale is a British journalist who is the BBC's diplomatic correspondent.

Education

Landale was educated at Eton College, where he was a near contemporary of former Prime Minister David Cameron, before going on to study at the University of Bristol. While studying Politics there, he became the first editor of Epigram, Bristol University's independent student newspaper. In July 2013, Landale was awarded an honorary Doctor of Laws degree from Bristol University in recognition of his journalistic achievements.

Career
Before joining the BBC in 2003, Landale spent 10 years as a reporter with The Times newspaper, latterly as Assistant Foreign Editor.

In 2005 Landale wrote Duel, a book about a 1826 duel in Kirkcaldy involving his ancestor David Landale.

Landale was chief political correspondent for the BBC News Channel until 2009 when he became Deputy Political Editor, assisting then Political Editor Nick Robinson. During his time as a political correspondent he presented some relief shifts on the channel.

In July 2017, Landale rejected an offer from Prime Minister Theresa May to become the eighth Downing Street Director of Communications. The role was taken by fellow BBC journalist Robbie Gibb.

Personal life 
Landale lives in London. He was diagnosed with large B-cell Non-Hodgkin's lymphoma in October 2008, and underwent six courses of chemotherapy.

In 2015, Landale was named Broadcaster of the Year by the Political Studies Association for his "huge contribution to the public understanding of politics".

Books
 Landale, James (2005). Duel: A True Story of Death and Honour. Cannongate. 
Landale, James (2006). Landale's Cautionary Tales: Comic Verse for the 21st Century. Cannongate.

References

External links

James Landale on Twitter
Profile at tvnewsroom.co.uk
Landale reports on travelling with the Prime Minister

Year of birth missing (living people)
Living people
British political commentators
People educated at Eton College
Alumni of the University of Bristol
English male journalists
English people of Scottish descent
BBC newsreaders and journalists
English male non-fiction writers
British social commentators